Myrmozercon is a genus of mites in the family Laelapidae.

Species
 Myrmozercon acuminatus (Berlese, 1903)     
 Myrmozercon aequalis (Banks, 1916)     
 Myrmozercon antennophoroides (Berlese, 1903)     
 Myrmozercon brachiatus (Berlese, 1903)     
 Myrmozercon brevipes Berlese, 1902
 Myrmozercon cyrusi Ghafarian & Joharchi, in Ghafarian, Joharchi, Jalalizand & Jalaeian, 2013
 Myrmozercon diplogenius (Berlese, 1903)     
 Myrmozercon iainkayi Walter, 2003     
 Myrmozercon karajensis Joharchi et al., 2011
 Myrmozercon liguricus (Vitzthum)     
 Myrmozercon robustisetae Rosario & Hunter, 1988     
 Myrmozercon rotundiscutum Rosario & Hunter, 1988     
 Myrmozercon scutellatus (Hull, 1923)

References

Laelapidae